Minuscule 492 (in the Gregory-Aland numbering), ε 433 (in the Soden numbering), is a Greek minuscule manuscript of the New Testament, on parchment. It is dated by a colophon to the year 1325 or 1326. 
Scrivener labeled it by number 577.
The manuscript has complex contents.

Description 

The codex contains a complete text of the four Gospels on 269 parchment leaves (size ). The text is written in one column per page, 24 lines per page. According to Scrivener it is beautifully written.

Liturgical books with hagiographies Synaxarion and Menologion were added by a later hand.

Text 

The Greek text of the codex is a representative of the Byzantine text-type. Aland placed it in Category V.
Hermann von Soden included it to the textual family Kx. It was confirmed by Claremont Profile Method in Luke 1 and Luke 20. In Luke 10 no profile was made.

History 

The manuscript was written by Constantin, a monk, for the wish of Archimadrite Kallinikus, in the monastery of the Saint Demetrius. It was once at Sinai, then it belonged to the Bishop Butler's collection (as 491 and 493).

The manuscript was added to the list of New Testament manuscripts by Scrivener (577) and Gregory (492). It was examined by Scrivener and Bloomfield. Edward Maunde Thompson published facsimile.

It is currently housed at the British Library (Add MS 11838) in London.

See also 

 List of New Testament minuscules
 Biblical manuscript
 Textual criticism

References

Further reading 

 A. Turyn, Dated Greek Manuscripts of the Thirteenth and Fourteenth Centuries in the Libraries of Great Britain, Dumbarton Oaks Series XVII (Washington, D.C., 1980), p. 60, 90.
 Facsimiles of Ancient Manuscripts, ed. E. M. Thompson and others, I (London, 1903-1912); New Pal Soc I, 130.

External links 
 

Greek New Testament minuscules
14th-century biblical manuscripts
British Library additional manuscripts